Christ Episcopal Church is a historic church at 156 S. Main Street in Oberlin, Ohio.

It was built in 1855 and added to the National Register in 1978.

In addition to weekly masses, the church offers weekday community meals and a home stay program.

References

External links
 Official website

Episcopal churches in Ohio
Churches on the National Register of Historic Places in Ohio
Romanesque Revival church buildings in Ohio
Churches completed in 1855
Churches in Lorain County, Ohio
National Register of Historic Places in Lorain County, Ohio
Oberlin, Ohio
19th-century Episcopal church buildings